Callander is a town in Scotland.

Callander may also refer to:

Places
 Callander, Ontario, Canada
 Callander Bay, Ontario

Other uses
 Callander (surname)
 Callander F.C., 19th-century Scottish football club

See also

 Calendar
 Calender
 Callendar (disambiguation)
 Callender (disambiguation)
 Colander
 Qalandar (disambiguation)